SEPO (pronounced "sepo") is an American punk rock band from Los Angeles, California, United States. The band was formed in 2012 by front-man and songwriter, Mitch Bateman. According to Bateman the name comes from a derogatory Australian term for Americans. Sepo first gained notoriety for their energetic live shows and their single, Siren, which was part of a documentary titled, 39 Days. After the success of Siren, and a few live shows, the band began recording their third album with Dave Klein at Dave Klein Recording Studios in Los Angeles. SEPO continues to record and play live shows around the country and in the Los Angeles area.

Band members

Current
 Mitch Bateman - vocals
 Alex Sawyer - guitar
 David Chang - drums
 Miguel Ferreira - bass

Former
 Dave Klein - bass
 Jacob Long - guitar
 Jesse Killings - drums
 Gil Fabian - guitar
 Lilian - bass
 Adam Campbell - bass
 Mark Mullican -  guitar
 Cappy Tillman - harmonica

Discography

Studio albums
 Self-titled, AZ Studios, (Old Crew Records [2012])
 City of L.A., Ill Music Studios (Old Crew Records [2013])
 SEPO 3, Dave Klein Recording Studios (Old Crew Records [2015])

Compilations
 Daggersight Records Volume Two (2012)
 Wolfman Chuck meets SEPO (2014)
 One Man Bands and Serial Killers (2014)

DVDs 
 39 Days (2012)
 Tucson Underground Punks (Composer Credits [2012])
 SEPO DVD (Old Crew Records [2015])

References 

2012 establishments in California
Punk rock groups from California
Musical groups established in 2012
Musical groups from Los Angeles